The Light of Things Hoped For is the second album by Christian rock band Brave Saint Saturn, released in 2003 (see 2003 in music).

The album is described as "astro-rock" and tells a story dealing with many personal struggles of the band members.

Concept

The Light of Things Hoped For chronicles the crew of the U.S.S. Gloria (Roper, Culp, Hoerig, Verdecchio) as they continue their study of the moons of Saturn.  As the album begins, the crew has just received the command from Mission Control to return home.  The mood quickly changes, however, as complications arise.  Gases are emitted from the Gloria, sending the ship careening into the eclipse of Titan, Saturn's largest moon.  Communications cut out, and all seems to be lost.  The crew reflects on what had happened and what they had lost, drawing the comparison of being away from the light of Christ.  The album ends in a series of radio transmissions between the Gloria and Mission Control, and the U.S.S. Gloria emerges from the shadow of Titan and into the light, once again drawing the comparison between the Sun and Christ and the light He brings.

Reception

HM gave the album a positive review, saying it has a more serious focus than the band's debut, and shows growth in vocal and musical depth as well. Allmusic called it "a universe of soaring vocal harmonies and sugary pop hooks", praising the use of sound samples and the absence of preaching in the lyrics.

Controversy

Tooth and Nail edited two tracks on the album without the band's permission. On the song "Enamel" a record scratch covers the end of the line "When you hear this song, I hope it hurts like Hell." Edits on "Heart Still Beats" cover the word "pissed" and the line "Go to hell."

Unedited versions of both tracks have been leaked to the internet. If the CD is ordered from Brave Saint Saturn's online store, they will email the unedited songs to the purchaser.

Track listing
"Prologue" (Reese Roper) – 1:12
"The Sun Also Rises" (Roper) – 3:15
"Binary" (Roper) – 3:54
"Mercury" (Saki) – 0:42
"Enamel" (Roper) – 3:32
"Anastasia" (Roper) – 4:18
"Titan" (Roper) – 3:35
"Gemini" (Saki) – 1:06
"Estrella" (Roper) – 4:37
"Heart Still Beats" (Dennis Culp) – 4:28
"Babies Breath" (Roper) – 4:07
"I Fell Away" (Roper) – 3:13
"Recall" (Culp) – 4:21
"Atropos" (Roper) – 1:08
"Daylight" (Roper) – 6:24
"Irides of M" (Hidden Track)

The song "Titan" is introduced by a clip of the computer WOPR asking "Shall we play a game?" from the film WarGames.

The song "Estrella" was written by Reese Roper in his basement about his 25-year-old friend, Matt Estrella, who suffered from Neurofibromatosis 2 and died a year before the album came out.

Personnel
Dennis Culp - bass, electric guitar, keyboard, background vocals, narrator, vox organ
Dave Fredrickson - saw
Keith Hoerig - bass
Justin McRoberts - background vocals, voices
Reese Roper - piano, electric guitar, acoustic guitar, keyboard, vox organ, lead vocals
Monica Smith - background vocals
Andrew "Chaka" Verdecchio - drums
Masaki Liu - additional electric guitar, additional acoustic guitar, violin
Jen Hollingsworth - narrator
Vinnie Angello - percussion
Phil Bennet - wurlitzer, keys

Production
Producers: Masaki and Reese Roper
Executive producers: Brandon Ebel, Tyson Paoletti
Programming: Dennis Culp, Reese Roper
Layout design: Aaron James
Artwork: Aaron James
Illustrations: Reese Roper
Photography: Melinda Culp

References

Brave Saint Saturn albums
2003 albums
Concept albums
Tooth & Nail Records albums